Relizane or Ghilizan (Arabic: غلیزان; Berber: Ɣilizan) is a city in Algeria. It is the capital city of Relizane Province.

Toponymy 
The name of Relizane comes from the Berber ⵉⵖⵉⵍ ⵉⵣⵣⴰⵏ (Iɣil Izzan) which means “burnt / grilled hill”. The Turks built a bordj there, hence the name Bordj Ighil Izan, to control the road to Oran. The population is mainly from the Flittas and Beni-Ouragh of Ouarsenis.

Story

Antiquity 
The history of the region dates back to the time of the Kingdom of Numidia which was between 203 and 213 BC. The region takes its name from a stream called Mina. The region of Mina knows under the Roman domination which lasted nearly five centuries, its apogee in the agricultural and commercial development because of the fertility of its grounds and the richness of its soil. Relizane is founded on the location of the ancient Roman Castellum de Mina.

Islamization 
Islam made its appearance in the western region in 681, in 719-720 the tribes of Relizane all converted to Islam with the arrival of Moussa Ibn Noçaïr.

French colonization 
In the nineteenth century, agriculture was very often threatened by frequent droughts. It was not in 1852 that French troops occupied Relizane, a colonial settlement center was created by imperial decree on February 27, 1857, and was elevated to the rank of a full-service commune on February 5, 1871.

In 1844, the French engineers repaired the old dam (the old hydraulic works, partially restored in the 18th century). In 1853, the first Europeans settled in the plain and cultivated small areas of wheat and barley plus a few areas of tobacco that were quickly abandoned (malaria decimated entire populations at the time). But the creation of Relizane was not decided until January 1857. Since then, certain houses built after the Algiers-Oran railway have given it a new face. In the meantime the European population is increasing. The French come from the South (Gard) and the Spaniards from Valencia, Alicante, Murcia, Almería. About twenty farms cultivated cotton. The city then experienced a prodigious development, but disease, drought, insufficient harvests slowed down any progress. Let us add to the natural disaster, the events which preceded the imperial voyage5 and whose aftermath [Which?] Were the main reason for the incident6 of May 1865. In the south of Oran the revolt of the Ouled Sidi Cheikh broke out, a revolt due to discontent of the population since 1860. The disillusions and promises [Which?] not kept by the occupier are at the origin of one of the biggest insurrections which will last until 1896.

A labor camp is used to imprison Spanish Republican refugees at the end of the Spanish Civil War (see Retirada) .

The population of Relizane took part in the national liberation struggle and made the city part of the contemporary history of Algeria against French colonization

Personalities linked to the city 
 Abdellah Hezil
 Ahmed Francis
 Alain Bensoussan
 Alain Bentolila
 Dominique Cabrera
 Ali Boumendjel
 Mustapha Laliam 
 Mohammed Abbou 
 Colonel Amirouche
 M"hamed Issiakhem
 Chikha Rabiaa
 Cheb Moumen
 Chaba Zohra Relizania
 Sami relizani
 Hadj Belkhir
 Douba Fatiha
 Belakhdar Touffik

References

External links
 

Communes of Relizane Province
Cities in Algeria
Province seats of Algeria
Algeria